Rexton may refer to:

 Rexton, New Brunswick, Canada
 SsangYong Rexton, a sport utility vehicle manufactured by SsangYong
 A hearing aid brand manufactured by WS Audiology

See also

 Port Rexton